Dovhyi Island is a small sandy island in Ochakiv Raion, Mykolaiv Oblast in Ukraine.

The island along with Kruhlyi island serves as a separation of Yahorlyk Bay from Black Sea located at the western part of the bay. It is located to the south from Kinburn peninsula.

External links
 Dovhyi Island at the Encyclopedia of Ukraine

Geography of Mykolaiv Oblast
Islands of Ukraine
Islands of the Black Sea